Medea Petrovna Amiranashvili (born October 10, 1930) is a Georgian opera singer (lyric soprano), teacher. People's Artist of USSR (1976).

Biography
Medea Amiranashvili was born October 10, 1930, in the village of Shorapani (now in Imereti, Georgia) (according to other sources - in Tbilisi) in a family of opera singers, USSR People's Artist and singer Peter Amiranashvili and Nadezhda Tsomaia.

In 1953 she graduated from the Tbilisi Sarajishvili konservatoriiyu name, where she studied with Alexander Inashvili and  Olga Bakhutashvili-Shulgina. In 1951-1954 gg. - Soloist of the opera studio at the Conservatory.
Since 1954 - the soloist of Tbilisi Opera and Ballet Theatre

She has performed in concerts and as a chamber singer.

She has toured Poland, Czechoslovakia, Romania, East Germany, Hungary, Bulgaria, Australia, New Zealand, France, Canada.

Since 1972, she teaches at the Conservatory of Tbilisi (from 1982 - professor).

From 1991 to 2006 - she was the art director of the Kutaisi Opera House.

Member of the Supreme Council of the Georgian SSR 7-th convocation.

Honorary Citizen of Kutaisi.

Family 
 Father - Petr Amiranashvili (1907-1976), an opera singer, People's Artist of the USSR (1950)
 Mother - Nadezhda Tsomaia (1904-1973), an opera singer, People's Artist of the Georgian SSR (1943)
Brother -  David Amiranashvili

 Male - Otar Parulava, sculptor
 Daughter - Marine Parulava, singer.

References

1930 births
Living people
People from Imereti
Soviet women opera singers
20th-century women opera singers from Georgia (country)
Classical musicians from Georgia (country)
People's Artists of the USSR
Tbilisi State Conservatoire alumni
Recipients of the Order of Friendship of Peoples